The Fels Institute of Government at the University of Pennsylvania is a graduate school of public policy and public management. Founded in 1937 by Samuel Simeon Fels of the Fels Naptha Soap Company, the Fel Institute prepares its students for public leadership positions in city, state, and federal agencies, elective politics, nonprofit organizations, and private firms with close connections to the public sector. 

The Fels Institute is housed in Samuel Fels' former residence, a brick mansion located on the west end of the University of Pennsylvania's campus.

Academics
Fels offers a Master of Public Administration degree in both full-time and executive (part-time) formats.  Fels also offers four-course certificates in Nonprofit Administration and Public Finance.

Faculty

 Dr. Robert Pearson: Carnegie-Mellon, Pearson's R (regression)- His model was not fully specified
 Hon. Edward G. Rendell: Former Governor of the Commonwealth of Pennsylvania
 Marjorie Margolies-Mezvinsky: CEO, Women's Campaign International; Former Member of Congress

 Jim Kenney: Mayor of the City of Philadelphia 
 Stephen Mullin: Senior Vice President, Econsult Corporation; Econsult Solutions Inc.; Former Philadelphia City Finance Director
 Eric Costello Neiderman: Manager, Cargo Security Research & Development, Transportation Security Administration, Dept. of Homeland Security 
 Wayne A. Smith: President and CEO, Delaware Healthcare Association; former House Majority Leader, Delaware General Assembly

Notable Fels alumni

 Jennifer Beck: New Jersey State Senator, Represents the 12th legislative district
 David Byerman '95, Secretary of the Senate of the Nevada Senate
 Robert Bittenbender '98:  Former Budget Secretary under Pennsylvania Governors Tom Ridge, Mark Schweiker and Dick Thornburgh, and former executive director of the Senate Appropriations Committee.
 Peter Brown '99: Professor at the University of Minnesota and author of America's Waterfront Revival Port Authorities and Urban Redevelopment.
 Donna Cooper '87: Senior Fellow, Center for American Progress, and former Pennsylvania Secretary of Policy and Planning
 Madeleine Dean (attended): US Representative for Pennsylvania's 4th congressional district, a house manager for the Second impeachment of Donald Trump, former Pennsylvania House Representative
 Scott Detrow: NPR White House Correspondent and NPR Politics Podcast host
 Stephen Dilts '96: New Jersey Transportation Commissioner
 Joseph A. Esposito '06: Former Deputy Under Secretary for International Affairs at the U.S. Department of Education
 Chaka Fattah '86: US Congressman 

 Matthew Gallagher '97: Chief of Staff, Governor of Maryland Martin J. O'Malley
 Wilson Goode: First African-American Mayor of Philadelphia (1984–1992)
 Richard Keevey: Former Director of the Princeton University Woodrow Wilson School's Research Institute on the Region
 George M. Leader: Former Governor of Pennsylvania (1955-1959)
 Rob Powelson '03: Commissioner, Federal Energy Regulatory Commission; Former Chairman of Pennsylvania Public Utility Commission
Frank A. Salvatore: Pennsylvania Representative for the 170th district (1973-1984); Pennsylvania State Senator for the 5th district (1985-2000)
 Anna Shapoval '04: Country Director, Doctors of the World - Kiev, Ukraine
 Richard Smith '91: Acting Assistant Deputy Secretary of Education
 Richard Steffens '88: US Diplomat and author & lyricist for the Carnegie Hall production Mother Russia.
 Greg Walker '05: Policy and Planning Officer, Sound Transit
 Rob Wonderling '91: Former Pennsylvania State Senator and current President and CEO of the Philadelphia Chamber of Commerce

Fels Publications
Vacant Property Reclamation and Neighborhood Change in Southwest Center City Philadelphia (July 2008): Details the current status of vacant properties surveyed in 1998 to better understand the changing neighborhood.
MyVote1 National Election Report (Christopher Patusky, Allison Brummel, & Timothy Schmidt, August 2007): Summarizes the results of the 2006 MyVote1 National Election Hotline project.
The Philadelphia SchoolStat Model (Leigh Botwinik, Christopher Patusky, Mary Shelley, 2007): Describes how the Compstat and CitiStat models were adapted for the Philadelphia School District, what performance improvements occurred after implementation, and which features of the approach seemed to be the biggest contributors to improvement.
"Making the Most of Social Media" (Chris Kingsley, Allison Brummel, Catharine Lamb, & Jack Higgins, 2009):  Discusses the growth of Social Media over the past several years, including the challenges associated with adopting them for public use - legal, practical and political, and distills the experience of cities who have done this both more and less effectively into seven suggestions that cover the full cycle of adoption, from pre-planning to self-evaluation.

See also
 List of University of Pennsylvania people

References

External links
 
 Penn Arts and Science

 
University of Pennsylvania
Public administration schools in the United States
Educational institutions established in 1937
1937 establishments in Pennsylvania